FC Muras-Sport Bishkek is a Kyrgyzstani football club based in Bishkek, Kyrgyzstan that played in the top division in Kyrgyzstan, the Kyrgyzstan League.

History 
: Founded as FC Muras-Sport Bishkek.
: Dissolved.

Muras-Sport is the second team of Dordoy-Dinamo. The team was also used as a base for Kyrgyz U-19.

Achievements 
Kyrgyzstan League
4th place: 2006

External links 
Career stats by KLISF

Football clubs in Kyrgyzstan
Football clubs in Bishkek
2006 establishments in Kyrgyzstan
2007 disestablishments in Kyrgyzstan